National Highway 147D, commonly referred to as NH 147D is a national highway in India. It is a secondary route of National Highway 47.  NH-147D runs in the state of Gujarat in India.

Route 
NH147D connects Limkheda, Hathidhara, Fulpari, Limdi, Gujarat/ Madhya Pradesh Border in the state of Gujarat.

Junctions  

  Terminal near Limkheda.
  near Limdi.

See also 
 List of National Highways in India
 List of National Highways in India by state

References

External links 

 NH 147D on OpenStreetMap

National highways in India
National Highways in Gujarat